Claudio Ramiadamanana (born 22 October 1988) is a Malagasy professional footballer who plays as a striker. He played for the Madagascar national team from 2007 to 2018, scoring three goals in sixteen matches.

Club career 
Ramiadamanana left the Academie Ny Antsika in January 2008 and moved to Mueang Thong NongJork United in the Thailand Division 1 League. He left Thailand in July and moved to Romorantin in the Championnat National. In 2012, he joined Paris FC, playing five games and scoring one goal.

International career 
Ramiadamanana played with Madagascar by the 2007 COSAFA Cup.

International goals

Honours
Muangthong United
Thailand League Division 1: 2008
International
 COSAFA CUP U20: COSAFA U-20 Challenge Cup 2005
best player of the tournament COSAFA U-20 Challenge Cup 2005
Football at the Indian Ocean Island Games silver medal: 2007

References

External links
 
 
 Claudio Ramiadamanana at Foot-National.com

1988 births
Living people
People from Antananarivo
Malagasy footballers
Association football forwards
Madagascar international footballers
Academie Ny Antsika players
Claudio Ramiadamanana
SO Romorantin players
US Orléans players
Paris FC players
Bourges 18 players
JS Saint-Pierroise players
La Roche VF players
FC Chartres players
AS Excelsior players
Pacy Ménilles RC players
Claudio Ramiadamanana
Championnat National 2 players
Championnat National players
Championnat National 3 players
Malagasy expatriate footballers
Expatriate footballers in Thailand
Expatriate footballers in France
Expatriate footballers in Réunion
Malagasy expatriate sportspeople in Thailand
Malagasy expatriate sportspeople in France
Malagasy expatriate sportspeople in Réunion